Oenopota murdochiana is a species of sea snail, a marine gastropod mollusk in the family Mangeliidae.

Description
The length of the shell measures 11.5 mm.

(Original description) The whitish shell is short, stout, with rather coarse sculpture and very short spire. It contains about five whorls, the body whorl much the largest . The whorls are  inflated. The suture is deep, almost channeled. The sculpture consists of numerous (on the body whorl about two to the millimeter) narrow, backwardly convex, tlexuous riblets with about equal interspaces, strongest near the suture, not crossing the fasciole and obsolete near the periphery. The lines of growth are distinct, crossed by numerous (about six to the millimeter) rather coarse threads, of which each alternate one tends to be smaller, separated by narrow grooves and about uniformly distributed over the surface, with a tendency to a faint carina in front of the indistinct fasciole. The outer lip is sharp. The simple columella is white. The aperture is pinkish. The short siphonal canal is wide. The whorls of the protoconch are eroded in the specimens. The operculum has a light horn color. It is rather broad and short. The soft parts are pink.

Distribution
This marine species was found off Cape Smythe, Alaska at a depth of 9 m.

References

External links
 
 

murdochiana
Gastropods described in 1885